In computer programming, a language construct is a syntactically allowable part of a program that may be formed from one or more lexical tokens in accordance with the rules of the programming language.
The term "language construct" is often used as a synonym for control structure.

Control flow statements (such as conditionals, foreach loops, while loops, etc) are language constructs, not functions. So while (true) is a language construct, while add(10) is a function call.

Examples of language constructs
In PHP print is a language construct.
<?php
print 'Hello world';
?>

is the same as:

<?php
print('Hello world');
?>

Programming constructs

In Java a class is written in this format:public class MyClass {
    //Code . . . . . .
}

In C++ a class is written in this format:class MyCPlusPlusClass {
    //Code . . . .
};

References